Friedrich Karl Georg Fedde (30 June 1873, Breslau (now Wrocław) – 14 March 1942, Berlin-Dahlem) was a German botanist.

Biography 
Fedde studied natural sciences, commencing in 1892 and graduating in 1896 in Breslau. He was a teacher in schools of higher learning in Breslau, Tarnowitz and Berlin. He became an associate at the Berlin Botanical Museum in 1901 and a professor there in 1912.
He participated in several collecting trips to the Mediterranean, Finland and South Russia.
Fedde's main work dealt with plant systematics and biogeography. His renown rests mainly on the publication of the Repertorium Specierum Novarum Regni Vegetabilis and its Beihefte for longer monographs. 

The genus Feddea (Asteraceae) Urb.  was named in his honor.

Publications
Extensive bibliography at WorldCat

References
 Allg. Deutsche Biographie.
 NATHO, G., 1998 Zur Erinnerung an Friedrich Fedde (1873-1942). Fedde Rep. 109:473-477.

External links 
 Repertorium specierum novarum regni vegetabilis at the Biodiversity Heritage Library 

1873 births
1942 deaths
German taxonomists
German phytogeographers
Scientists from Wrocław
People from the Province of Silesia